Gargoyle: Wings of Darkness (also known as Gargoyles' Revenge) is a 2004 film that was distributed by CineTel Films and Lionsgate. It was first aired on the Sci Fi Channel.

Plot
In 1592 Romania, villagers tormented by an evil demon ultimately succeed in sealing the creature away in a tomb, until a series of earthquakes in 2004 finally unleashes the evil thought to have vanished from the earth forever. Now, two CIA agents Ty 'Griff' Griffin and Jennifer Wells who have been sent to Bucharest to investigate a kidnapping must solve the string of brutal murders that are multiplying rapidly. Unfortunately, they have no idea of the enormity of the evil they face. As their investigation leads them astray, the monster has reproduced, and gargoyle eggs are hatching a reign of terror worldwide. The result is a struggle between good and evil of mythological proportions.

Cast
 Michael Paré as CIA Agent Ty "Griff" Griffin
 Sandra Hess as CIA Agent Jennifer Wells
 Fintan McKeown as Father Nikolai Soren
 Kate Orsini as Dr. Christina Durant
 Tim Abell as Lucian "Lex The Slayer" Slavati, Romanian Club Entertainer & Crime Boss
 William Langlois as Inspector Zev Aslan
 Petri Roega as Father Adrian Bodesti
 Rene Rivera as Gogol Solacka, Romanian Kidnapper
 Arthur Roberts as Bishop At Monastery
 Jason Rohrer as Dr. Richard Barrier
 Mihai Bisericanu as Gregor, Church Grounds Keeper
 Bogdan Uritescu as "Zero", Romanian Crime Boss
 Claudiu Trandafir as Boris, Man On Ferris Wheel 
 Cristi Groza as Ionut, Teacher At Zoo
 Lewis Cojocar as Yuri, A Member of Gogol's Gang
 Jim Wynorski as Bogdan, Member of Lex's Gang
 Claudiu Istodor as 1532 Priest, That Captured & Imprisoned The Gargoyle
 Nataliya Zamilatska as Anca, Church Parishioner
 Annie Cerillo as Coroner
 Daniela Nane as Peasant Girl
 Roxana Baches as Lily, Romanian Entertainer At Lex's Club
 Alina Teodorescu as Lara #1, Romanian Entertainer At Lex's Club
 Alexandra Serb as Lara #2, Romanian Entertainer At Lex's Club
 Dan Fintescu as James Sloane, The Son of The U.S. Ambassador
 Alexandru Nicolae as Boy At Amusement Park #1
 Robert Barladeanu as Boy At Amusement Park #2
 Danut Masala as Boy At Amusement Park #3
 Stefan Ioniță as Boy At Amusement Park #4

References

External links

  
 

Syfy original films
American supernatural horror films
2004 horror films
2004 films
Gargoyles in popular culture
CineTel Films films
American multilingual films
Lionsgate films
Romanian supernatural horror films
Romanian multilingual films
American horror television films
Canadian horror television films
Canadian supernatural horror films
2000s Romanian-language films
English-language Romanian films
2000s English-language films
Films set in the 1590s
Films set in 2004
2004 multilingual films
Films directed by Jim Wynorski
2000s American films
2000s Canadian films